The St. Louis Cardinals 2012 season was the 131st season for the franchise in St. Louis, Missouri, the 121st season in the National League, and the seventh at Busch Stadium III. The Cardinals made their 25th trip to the postseason in 2012 after taking the NL Wild Card title by one game over the Atlanta Braves on the last day of the regular season in 2011. They began the 2012 season away against the Miami Marlins on April 4. St. Louis was coming off a 90–72 (.556) season, a second-place finish in the NL Central, the aforementioned wild card berth, and their National League-leading 11th World Series championship.

In 2012, they finished with an 88–74 (.543) record and second place in the NL Central. By virtue of coming in second to the Atlanta Braves, they won the second National League Wild Card spot, and then beat the Braves in the Wild Card Game. They then played the NL East champion Washington Nationals in the NLDS and beat them in five games to advance to the NL Championship Series against the San Francisco Giants. However, they lost to the Giants in seven games after leading the series 3 games to 1.

Offseason departures and acquisitions

Management
On October 31, 2011, Tony La Russa announced his retirement after 16 years as manager of the Cardinals.
After interviewing several candidates, the Cardinals announced, in a press conference on November 14, that former Cardinals catcher Mike Matheny would be the team's new manager, the 49th in team history. At 41, he is the youngest active manager in the majors. He holds the catching major league record for consecutive errorless games at 252, and for consecutive errorless chances with 1,565.

On November 16, Matheny and the Cardinals announced the new coaching staff: Dave Duncan stayed on as the pitching coach for the 17th year as he was the only coach under contract, with third-base coach Jose Oquendo, hitting coach and former Cardinals slugger Mark McGwire, and bullpen coach Derek Lilliquist. 50-year-old Mike Aldrete moved from assistant hitting coach to bench coach. Chris Maloney also 50 years of age, moved from manager of the AAA Memphis Redbirds of the Pacific Coast League to first-base coach in St. Louis; his first time on a major league staff. Former bench coach Joe Pettini and first-base coach Dave McKay moved to other roles in baseball operations for the team.

On December 2, former Cardinals outfielder John Mabry was named assistant hitting coach.

Hitters
On December 8, Albert Pujols signed a 10-year contract with the Los Angeles Angels worth $254 million, declining a 10-year $220 million offer by the Cardinals. His old contract paid him $111 million over eight years from 2004 to 2011. Pujols departed among the leaders in virtually every major offensive category in Cardinals franchise history. At the time of the signing of the contract, he was fourth all-time in hits, third in runs and second in total bases, doubles, home runs, RBIs and walks. He was behind only Stan Musial in the five latter categories. He was seventh in games played and could have climbed as high as third with two more seasons in a Cardinals uniform. He was paid $14,508,395 in 2011. His former teammates were stunned by his decision.

On December 10, the team re-signed Rafael Furcal to a two-year deal worth $14 mil.

On December 12, the Cardinals refused to offer a contract to Ryan Theriot, making him a non-tendered free agent.  On the same day, utilityman [2B/OF] Skip Schumaker accepted a two-year deal worth $3 mil. avoiding free agency after 2012. He was paid $4.7 mil. in his just completed two-year deal.

On December 22, the Cardinals signed outfielder Carlos Beltrán to a two-year deal.

On March 1, 2012, the Cardinals announced the extension of catcher Yadier Molina's expiring $7 mil. contract at the end of 2012, for 5 years (with a 6th year $15 mil. option for 2018) for $75 mil., making him the second-highest-paid catcher (to Twins catcher Joe Mauer) in all of baseball. He leads all catchers with 39 pickoffs since 2005, and has thrown out 44% of all basestealers in his eight years. He led all Cardinals batters in 2011 with a .305 batting average, starting more games behind the plate than any other catcher, and established career-highs with 55 runs scored, 32 doubles, 14 home runs, and 65 RBIs.

Pitchers
On December 15, 2011, the Cardinals signed 35-year-old lefty reliever J. C. Romero to a one-year contract.

The Cardinals invited nineteen players to spring training camp.

The team finished setting its 25-man roster on March 30. Placed on the DL were pitcher Chris Carpenter, utilityman Skip Schumaker, and outfielder Allen Craig.

Regular season

April
On Sunday, April 22 at Pittsburgh, the Cardinals became the first defending world champion team since the 1922 New York Giants to open their title defense with six consecutive series win. They had a record of 11-5 (.688) during that streak. The series streak ended on April 24, with a second consecutive loss to the Cubs in Chicago, although winning the final game of the series on April 25.

May
The Cardinals announced they would retire former manager Tony La Russa' #10 prior to the game on May 11. His number will be the 12th retired by the Cardinals. He ranks third on the managers' all-time wins list with 2,728. 1,408 of those came with the Cardinals in his 16-year tenure there, and his .544 winning percentage with the team is his best of the three clubs he managed in his 33 seasons.

On May 14, Carlos Beltrán was named the National League Player of the Week for the week of May 7–13 after posting six home runs, 13 RBIs, eight runs scored, 30 total bases, and a 1.200 slugging percentage. He collected hits in five of the six games, homering in four of them. This is Beltran's ninth Player of the Week Award and his sixth in the National League. He leads the National League with 15 home runs, and is second in RBIs, with 32.

At home on May 22, Adam Wainwright threw his first complete game shutout since August 6, 2010, in a 4−0 victory over the San Diego Padres. Wainwright missed the entire 2011 season recovering from elbow surgery. It was his ninth career complete game and just his third shutout.

June
Johan Santana threw the first no-hitter in New York Mets' 51-year history (totaling 8,019 regular season and 74 post-season games previously) with an 8−0 shutout over the Cardinals and Adam Wainwright at Citi Field on June 1. 27,069 witnessed the no-hitter, with Santana throwing a career-high 134 pitches. He walked five, and struck out eight. (box score) Left fielder Mike Baxter robbed Yadier Molina with a great catch in the seventh inning for the 20th out. Umpire Adrian Johnson ruled a hard grounder by former Met Carlos Beltrán (in his first return to New York) down the third-base line 'foul' although the ball made a mark on the chalk in the sixth inning. Beltran subsequently grounded out to third base on the next pitch. The no-hitter was the eighth against the Cardinals in their long history, the first time by Hall-of-Famer Christy Mathewson on July 15, 1901. The previous no-hitter against the Cardinals was by Fernando Valenzuela on June 29, 1990, at Dodger Stadium. The Cardinals were also the first defending World Series champion to be pitched a no-hitter against since the Oakland Athletics in their 1990 pennant season. On the opposite side, Cardinals' pitchers have thrown 10 no-hitters against opponents, the last one by Bud Smith against the San Diego Padres on September 3, 2001. The Padres are now the only present team without a no-hitter.

On June 7, Jaime García (left-hander), landed on the disabled list after his 2-inning June 5 start with a left shoulder sprain. He is the eighth player on it, one-off the season high of nine—at the same time with the seven others which include two starting pitchers (he and Chris Carpenter), two relievers (Scott Linebrink and Kyle McClellan), two infielders (Lance Berkman and Matt Carpenter), and two outfielders (Jon Jay and Skip Schumaker).

On June 15, batting against his old team the Kansas City Royals, Carlos Beltrán became the first switch-hitter in MLB history to attain 300 home runs and 300 stolen bases, with his seventh stolen base in the second inning. Seven other hitters also are members of the 300-300 club.

July
Carlos Beltrán (of) and Rafael Furcal (ss) won the fan voting to be starters at their positions for the 83rd All-Star Game in Kansas City's Kauffman Stadium on July 10. Yadier Molina (c) was selected by the players as a reserve for his fourth consecutive year; he ranked second in the voting to starter Buster Posey. Lance Lynn was also selected by the players as a reserve pitcher; his first time going to the All-Star Game. Retired Cardinals' manager Tony La Russa will un-retire for the one game. Coaches Derek Lilliquist, Jose Oquendo and Mark McGwire will also be participating in the event, as all are members of La Russa's All-Star staff. Former St. Louis coaches Joe Pettini, Dave McKay and Dave Duncan are members of that coaching staff, as well. Beltran is leading the NL with 61 RBIs, and second in home runs with 20. He also ranks in the top 10 with a .310 batting average. It will be his fourth time as an All-Star fan-vote starter, seventh overall. As an added bonus for Beltran, he was also picked to participate in the Home Run Derby contest on July 9, the night before the All-Star Game. It will be the first time for him in that fan-favorite event.

On July 6, after the passing of Yadier Molina's wife's grandfather, he left the team to join his family in Puerto Rico and was put on the bereavement list. He will miss the three weekend games and won't participate in the All-Star game. Matt Holliday was picked by Tony La Russa to replace him on the roster. Bryan Anderson was recalled from AAA-Memphis to replace Molina on the Cardinals' roster, with Tony Cruz to start as catcher for the weekend games.

After the rosters were opened to the fans, voting was held to decide the final fan-voted addition to each team.  The online balloting was conducted from Sunday afternoon, July 1, through Thursday afternoon, July 5.  The winners of the final vote were  David Freese of the St. Louis Cardinals (NL), and Yu Darvish of the Texas Rangers (AL).  Chipper Jones, of the Atlanta Braves, was removed from the ballot on July 3 after he replaced Matt Kemp on the roster due to Kemp's injury.

The 83rd All-Star Game on July 10, at Kansas City's Kaufmann Stadium was an 8-0 blowout for the National League, its sixth shutout win against two shutout losses for the NL. It made retired manager Tony La Russa the first manager to win All-Star Games in both leagues. He was 3-0 in the AL, but 0-2 in the NL before this year's game. La Russa emphasized this was his final game as a manager.

On July 3, the team and disabled pitcher Chris Carpenter decided he will have season-ending surgery to repair his thoracic outlet syndrome that has plagued him all year with nerve-related shoulder problems. Recovery time is estimated at six months, so if done this month he will be ready for spring training in February 2013. Surgery is set for July 19, performed by Dr. Gregory Pearl in Dallas, Texas.

On July 16, Trevor Rosenthal was called up for the first time to the major leagues, and made his debut in the eighth inning on July 18, the 2,000th player in Cardinals' history. No other franchise in baseball has reached 2,000.

On July 21, at home against the Cubs, a 0−0 tight game started by Jake Westbrook (8-8, after getting the win in 7 inn.) was broken in the bottom of the seventh with a 12-run explosion by the Cardinals, won by that 12−0 score with 16 hits against only 4 for the Cubs. The inning-explosion featured 7 doubles, tying a major-league record set by the (NL) 1936 Boston Bees (against the Cardinals at Sportsmen's Park, first inning on August  25), 17 batters with 10 hits including a triple, 2 singles, 2 walks, and a wild pitch. David Freese started the inning with an infield single. Allen Craig then got one of his two doubles that inning, and the merry-go-round was on. The 12-runs in an inning also tied the highest runs in any inning by a Cardinals' team since the 1926 club did it in the third inning against the Phillies on September  15. Gameday Recap The club got 27 total bases and 9 doubles in the game—the last time they did that was on July 12, 1931.

The team made a trade on the last day of the non-waiver deadline, July 31, sending minor-league third baseman Zack Cox to the Miami Marlins for minor-league relief pitcher Edward Mujica.

August
On August 3, Lance Berkman went on the disabled list for the third time this season with knee problems.

Matt Holliday got his 1,500th career hit on August 30.

September
Yadier Molina got his 1,000th career hit on September 4, a rare infield single.

Shelby Miller got his first major league win as a reliever, in a crucial fourth game of the series, in the 12th-inning against the Los Angeles Dodgers on September 16.

On September 17, the Cardinals announced they were moving their short-season affiliation with the Batavia (NY) Muckdogs to the State College (PA) Spikes in the same New York–Penn League.

On September 19, the Cardinals announced they were moving their low-A team from Quad Cities (Iowa) back to Peoria (Illinois) where they had the team from 1995 to 2004, in the Midwest League.

On September 19, David Freese and Yadier Molina hit their 20th home runs of the seasons. It marked the first time in Cardinals' history that five players have hit 20 home runs in a season, with the shutout win against the Houston Astros. Carlos Beltrán (29), Matt Holliday (27), and Allen Craig (21) reached 20 previously.

On September 20, the Cardinals went over the 3 million attendance figure for the ninth consecutive year.

On September 21, Chris Carpenter returned to the rotation for the first time this season after surgery in July, refuting doctors' predictions of no pitching possible in 2012. He faced 22 batters (77 pitches, 47 strikes) in pitching five innings, giving up five hits (incl. a double and triple) and two runs, hitting one batter, walking one, and striking out two against the Chicago Cubs in Chicago, leading 3−2 after the fifth inning, but Fernando Salas blew the save for him with two-outs and two strikes in the ninth when leading 4–2, and the team lost in 11 innings. "My stuff wasn't as sharp as I'd like, it wasn't even as sharp as it's been in those simulated games", said Carpenter, who preceded this start with four simulated games. "I did the best I could to get as many outs as I could and give us a chance. It was fun to go out there. It's definitely something I can build on, and hopefully my stuff is sharper as I get out there more often."

On September 23, Pete Kozma hit his first home run. The next game on the 24th he hit his second home run.

On September 24, closer Jason Motte was named NL Player of the Week after saving all five of the Cardinals' wins in the week of September 17–23, and is leading the NL in saves with his 40th. He became the first closer with the Cardinals to save 40 games since Jason Isringhausen in 2004. It was the first time he has won that award, and the first time a closer had won it since Huston Street in 2009.

October
On October 2, despite losing in their 161st game with a chance to clinch in front of almost 40,000 fans, the team later clinched the second wild-card spot when the Los Angeles Dodgers lost to their arch-rival San Francisco Giants.

For the last game of the season at home on October 3, Shelby Miller, who started 2012 as the club's top prospect, made his major league debut as a starter against the Cincinnati Reds. He has already had five appearances (1-0, 2.35 ERA) in 7.2 IP as a reliever.

Season standings

NL Central standings

NL Wild Card

Performance Against National League Opponents

Performance Against American League Opponents

Performance Against Divisions

Players and Coaching Staff

Opening Day lineup

Roster

Minor Leagues

Farm system

LEAGUE CHAMPIONS: Springfield

For more information about minor league teams, minor league players and the St. Louis Cardinals organization, see St. Louis Cardinals minor league players and:

St. Louis Cardinals Farm System Affiliates 
2012 Prospect Watch 
Cards organization preview, Top 20 Prospects, MLB.com (February 8, 2012) 
Memphis Redbirds (Memphis Redbirds-AAA roster) 
Springfield Cardinals (Springfield Cardinals-AA roster)

Final Regular Season Statistics

Composite scoring by inning

Batters
Notes: G = Games played; AB = At bats; R = Runs; H = Hits; 2B = Doubles; HR = Home runs; RBI = Runs batted in; BB = Walks; SO = Strikeouts; GIDP = Grounded into double play; Avg. = Batting average; OBP = On-base percentage; SLG = Slugging percentage

Players HITTING statistics

BOLD = Lead NL 
* not on active roster 
** on personal leave; date and G missed 
† on 15-day disabled list; date DL and G missed 
†† on 60-day disabled list

TEAM HITTING statistics

Baseball Reference – 2012 St. Louis Cardinals

Starting pitchers
Note: GS = Games started; IP = Innings pitched; W = Wins; L = Losses; ERA = Earned run average; H = Hits allowed; HR = Home runs allowed; BB = Walks allowed; SO = Strikeouts; WHIP = (walks + hits) per inning pitched; HBP = Hit by pitch; BF = Batters faced; O-AVG = Opponent batting average.; O-OBP = Opponent on-base percentage.; O-SLG = Opponent slugging percentage.; R suppt = Runs support average from his team's batters per games started

Cardinals PITCHING statistics

Sortable TEAM PITCHING Statistics

Bold = lead NL
* not on active roster 
† on 15-day disabled list; DL date and G missed 
†† on 60-day disabled list

Relief pitchers
Notes: G = Games pitched; IP = Innings pitched; W = Wins; L = Losses; ERA = Earned run average; H = Hits allowed; HR = Home runs allowed; BB = Walks allowed; SO = Strikeouts; WHIP = (walks + hits) per inning pitched; HBP = Hit by pitch; BF = Batters faced; O-AVG = Opponent batting average; O-OBP = Opponent on-base percentage; O-SLG = Opponent slugging percentage 

17-27; 3.90 ERA;  473.1 IP;  434 H;  212 R;  205 ER;  55 HR;  165 BB;  435 SO; 1.266 WHIP 
42/64 SV/Opp; 115 Holds; 343/492 First Batter Retired (70%); 64/242 Inherited Runners Scored (26%)

Relievers statistics

Note: Jason Motte led all relief pitchers with 42 saves, recording all the total team saves for the season. He was also the National League leader in saves as well.

Scheduling and Results

Home attendance

2012 St. Louis Cardinals 
2011 St. Louis Cardinals

Game log
As with all 30 teams, Major League Baseball released the Cardinals' 2012 schedule on September 14, 2011.  The Cardinals' Opening Day game was away against the Miami Marlins on April 4 and was nationally televised by ESPN at 6 PM CDT.

All game times for the following table were in Central Time Zone, and were broadcast on Fox Sports Midwest, unless otherwise noted.  Twenty games from April 9 to August 10 were blacked out for those watching Fox Sports Midwest from their AT&T U-verse cable because of a financial dispute between them continuing from the previous year. Those games are marked with an asterisk (*) in the schedule below.

|- align="center" bgcolor="bbffbb"
| 1 || April 4 || @ Marlins 6:05pm (ESPN) || 4–1 || Lohse (1–0) || Johnson (0–1) || Motte (1) || 36,601 || 1–0
|- align="center" bgcolor="bbffbb"
| 2 || April 6 || @ Brewers 3:10pm || 11–5 || García (1–0) || Gallardo (0–1) || || 46,086 || 2–0
|- align="center" bgcolor="ffbbbb"
| 3 || April 7 || @ Brewers 3:05pm (Fox) || 6–0 || Greinke (1–0) || Wainwright (0–1) || || 42,084 || 2–1
|- align="center" bgcolor="bbffbb"
| 4 || April 8 || @ Brewers 1:10pm || 9–3 || Lynn (1–0) || Wolf (0–1) || || 33,211 || 3–1
|- align="center" bgcolor="bbffbb"
| 5 || April 9 || @ Reds 6:10pm * || 7–1 || Westbrook (1–0) || Bailey (0–1) || || 16,909 || 4–1
|- align="center" bgcolor="bbffbb"
| 6 || April 10 || @ Reds 6:10pm * || 3–1 || Lohse (2–0) || Leake (0–1) || Motte (2) || 17,110 || 5–1
|- align="center" bgcolor="ffbbbb"
| 7 || April 11 || @ Reds 11:35am || 4–3 || Chapman (2–0) || Rzepczynski (0–1) || || 20,672 || 5–2
|- align="center" bgcolor="ffbbbb"
| 8 || April 13 || Cubs 2:15pm || 9–5 || Samardzija (2–0) || Wainwright (0–2) || || 46,882 || 5–3
|- align="center" bgcolor="bbffbb"
| 9 || April 14 || Cubs 12:05pm (Fox) || 5–1 || Lynn (2–0) || Volstad (0–1) || || 46,792 || 6–3
|- align="center" bgcolor="bbffbb"
| 10 || April 15 || Cubs 1:15pm * || 10–3 || Westbrook (2–0) || Maholm (0–2) || || 44,952 || 7–3
|- align="center" bgcolor="bbffbb"
| 11 || April 17 || Reds 7:15pm * || 2–1 (10) || Motte (1–0) || LeCure (0–1) || || 35,562 || 8–3
|- align="center" bgcolor="bbffbb"
| 12 || April 18 || Reds 7:15pm || 11–1 || García (2–0) || Latos (0–2) || || 35,907 || 9–3
|- align="center" bgcolor="ffbbbb"
| 13 || April 19 || Reds 12:45pm || 6–3 || Arroyo (1–0) || Wainwright (0–3) || Marshall (2) || 40,049 || 9–4
|- align="center" bgcolor="bbffbb"
| 14 || April 20 || @ Pirates 6:05pm || 4–1 || Lynn (3–0) || Morton (0–1) || Motte (3) || 23,509 || 10–4
|- align="center" bgcolor="ffbbbb"
| 15|| April 21 || @ Pirates 6:05pm || 2–0 || Burnett (1–0) || Westbrook (2–1) || Hanrahan (2) || 25,218 || 10–5
|- align="center" bgcolor="bbffbb"
| 16 || April 22 || @ Pirates 12:35pm || 5–1 || Lohse (3–0) || Bédard (0–4) || || 30,437 || 11–5
|- align="center" bgcolor="ffbbbb"
| 17 || April 23 || @ Cubs 7:05pm * || 3–2 || Dolis (1–1) || Motte (1–1) || || 37,794 || 11–6
|- align="center" bgcolor="ffbbbb"
| 18 || April 24 || @ Cubs 7:05pm || 3–2 (10) || Russell (1–0) || Salas (0–1) || || 38,894 || 11–7
|- align="center" bgcolor="bbffbb"
| 19 || April 25 || @ Cubs 1:20pm || 5–1 || Lynn (4–0) || Volstad (0–3) || || 34,894 || 12–7
|- align="center" bgcolor="bbffbb"
| 20 || April 27 || Brewers 7:15pm * || 13–1 || Westbrook (3–1) || Gallardo (1–2) || || 43,063 || 13–7
|- align="center" bgcolor="bbffbb"
| 21 || April 28 || Brewers 12:05pm (Fox) || 7–3 || Lohse (4–0) || Estrada (0–1) || || 42,586 || 14–7
|- align="center" bgcolor="ffbbbb"
| 22 || April 29 || Brewers 1:15pm || 3–2 || Greinke (3–1) || García (2–1) || Axford (5) || 45,824 || 14–8
|-

|- align="center" bgcolor="bbffbb"
| 23 || May 1 || Pirates 7:15pm || 10–7 || Wainwright (1–3) || Morton (1–2) || Motte (4) || 36,345 || 15–8
|- align="center" bgcolor="bbffbb"
| 24 || May 2 || Pirates 7:15pm * || 12–3 || Lynn (5–0) || Burnett (1–2) || || 35,987 || 16–8
|- align="center" bgcolor="ffbbbb"
| 25 || May 3 || Pirates 12:45pm * || 6–3 || Bédard (2–4) || Westbrook (3–2) || || 40,601 || 16–9
|- align="center" bgcolor="ffbbbb"
| 26 || May 4 || @ Astros 7:05pm || 5–4 || Harrell (2–2) || Lohse (4–1) || Myers (7) || 27,201 || 16–10
|- align="center" bgcolor="ffbbbb"
| 27 || May 5 || @ Astros 6:05pm || 8–2 || Norris (2–1) || García (2–2) || || 23,633 || 16–11
|- align="center" bgcolor="bbffbb"
| 28 || May 6 || @ Astros 1:05pm || 8–1 || Wainwright (2–3) || Happ (2–2) || || 22,288 || 17–11
|- align="center" bgcolor="bbffbb"
| 29 || May 7 || @ D'backs 8:40pm || 9–6 || Lynn (6–0) || Saunders (2–2) || Motte (5) || 26,447 || 18–11
|- align="center" bgcolor="bbffbb"
| 30 || May 8 || @ D'backs 8:40pm || 6–1 || Westbrook (4–2) || Kennedy (3–2) || || 30,156 || 19–11
|- align="center" bgcolor="bbffbb"
| 31 || May 9 || @ D'backs 8:40pm || 7–2 || Lohse (5–1) || Miley (3–1) || Motte (6) || 27,710 || 20–11
|- align="center" bgcolor="ffbbbb"
| 32 || May 11 || Braves 7:15pm * || 9–7 (12) || Hernández (1–0)  || McClellan (0–1) || Kimbrel (11) || 45,190 || 20–12
|- align="center" bgcolor="ffbbbb"
| 33 || May 12 || Braves 6:15pm || 7–2 || Beachy (4–1) || Wainwright (2–4) || || 44,157 || 20–13
|- align="center" bgcolor="ffbbbb"
| 34 || May 13 || Braves 1:15pm || 7–4 || Hanson (4–3) || Lynn (6–1) || || 45,729 || 20–14
|- align="center" bgcolor="ffbbbb"
| 35 || May 14 || Cubs 6:07pm (ESPN) || 6–4 || Camp (2–1) || Boggs (0–1) || Dolis (4) || 44,276 || 20–15
|- align="center" bgcolor="bbffbb"
| 36 || May 15 || Cubs 12:45pm || 7–6 || Motte (2–1) || Dolis (2–3) || || 45,538 || 21–15
|- align="center" bgcolor="bbffbb"
| 37 || May 16 || @ Giants 9:15pm * || 4–1 || García (3–2) || Bumgarner (5–3) || Motte (7)  || 41,324 || 22–15
|- align="center" bgcolor="ffbbbb"
| 38 || May 17 || @ Giants 2:45pm * || 7–5 || Cain (3–2) || Wainwright (2–5) || Casilla (9) || 41,225 || 22–16
|- align="center" bgcolor="ffbbbb"
| 39 || May 18 || @ Dodgers 9:10pm || 6–5 || Jansen (3–0) || Salas (0–2) || || 40,906 || 22–17
|- align="center" bgcolor="ffbbbb"
| 40 || May 19 || @ Dodgers 9:10pm || 6–0 || Kershaw (4–1) || Westbrook (4–3) || || 39,383 || 22–18
|- align="center" bgcolor="ffbbbb"
| 41 || May 20 || @ Dodgers 7:00pm (ESPN) || 6–5 || Guerra (2–3) || Rzepczynski (0–2) || Jansen (5) || 44,005 || 22–19
|- align="center" bgcolor="bbffbb"
| 42 || May 21 || Padres 7:15pm || 5–4 || Motte (3–1) || Cashner (2–3) || || 40,360 || 23–19
|- align="center" bgcolor="bbffbb"
| 43 || May 22 || Padres 7:15pm || 4–0 || Wainwright (3–5) || Vólquez (2–4) || || 39,151 || 24–19
|- align="center" bgcolor="bbffbb"
| 44 || May 23 || Padres 7:15pm || 6–3 || Lynn (7–1) || Suppan (2–3) || Motte (8) || 40,715 || 25–19
|- align="center" bgcolor="ffbbbb"
| 45 || May 24 || Phillies 7:15pm || 10–9 || Valdés (1–0) || Salas (0–3) || Papelbon (13) || 40,135 || 25–20
|- align="center" bgcolor="ffbbbb"
| 46 || May 25 || Phillies 7:15pm || 5–3 (10) || Valdés (2–0) || Motte (3–2) || Papelbon (14) || 43,375 || 25–21
|- align="center" bgcolor="ffbbbb"
| 47 || May 26 || Phillies 6:15pm (Fox) || 4–0 || Kendrick (1–4) || García (3–3) || || 44,476 || 25–22 
|- align="center" bgcolor="bbffbb"
| 48 || May 27 || Phillies 1:15pm || 8–3 || Wainwright (4–5) || Halladay (4–5) || || 42,659 || 26–22
|- align="center" bgcolor="bbffbb"
| 49 || May 28 || @ Braves 12:10pm || 8–2 || Lynn (8–1) || Hanson (5–4) || || 42,126 || 27–22
|- align="center" bgcolor="ffbbbb"
| 50 || May 29 || @ Braves 6:10pm || 5–4 || Delgado (3–5) || Westbrook (4–4) || Kimbrel (14) || 26,218 || 27–23
|- align="center" bgcolor="ffbbbb"
| 51 || May 30 || @ Braves 6:10pm || 10–7 || Venters (3–2) || Rzepczynski (0–3) || Kimbrel (15) || 28,474 || 27–24
|-

|- align="center" bgcolor="ffbbbb"
| 52 || June 1 || @ Mets 6:10pm || 8–0 || Santana (3–2) || Wainwright (4–6) || || 27,069 || 27–25
|- align="center" bgcolor="ffbbbb"
| 53 || June 2 || @ Mets 3:10pm || 5–0 || Dickey (8–1) || Lynn (8–2) || || 27,914 || 27–26
|- align="center" bgcolor="ffbbbb"
| 54 || June 3 || @ Mets 7:05pm (ESPN2) || 6–1 || Niese (4–2) || Westbrook (4–5) || || 23,559 || 27–27
|- align="center" bgcolor="bbffbb"
| 55 || June 4 || @ Mets 12:10pm || 5–4 || Rzepczynski (1–3) || Rauch (3–5) || Motte (9) || 25,830 || 28–27
|- align="center" bgcolor="ffbbbb"
| 56 || June 5 || @ Astros 7:05pm || 9–8 || Harrell (5–4) || García (3–4) || Myers (14) || 18,911 || 28–28
|- align="center" bgcolor="bbffbb"
| 57 || June 6 || @ Astros 7:05pm || 4–3 || Wainwright (5–6) || Norris (5–3) || Motte (10) || 18,517 || 29–28
|- align="center" bgcolor="bbffbb"
| 58 || June 7 || @ Astros 7:05pm || 14–2 || Lynn (9–2) || Happ (4–6) || || 22,265 || 30–28
|- align="center" bgcolor="ffbbbb"
| 59 || June 8 || Indians 7:15pm || 6–2 || Tomlin (3–3) || Westbrook (4–6) || || 42,098 || 30–29
|- align="center" bgcolor="bbffbb"
| 60 || June 9 || Indians 6:15pm (Fox) || 2–0 || Lohse (6–1) || Masterson (2–6) || Motte (11) || 41,694 || 31–29
|- align="center" bgcolor="ffbbbb"
| 61 || June 10 || Indians 1:15pm || 4–1 || Pestano (3–0) || Motte (3–3) || Perez (20) || 43,400 || 31–30
|- align="center" bgcolor="ffbbbb"
| 62 || June 12 || White Sox 7:15pm || 6–1 || Quintana (2–1) || Wainwright (5–7) || || 40,972 || 31–31
|- align="center" bgcolor="bbffbb"
| 63 || June 13 || White Sox 7:15pm * || 1–0 || Lynn (10–2) || Peavy (6–2) || Motte (12) || 40,045 || 32–31
|- align="center" bgcolor="bbffbb"
| 64 || June 14 || White Sox 7:15pm * || 5–3 || Westbrook (5–6) || Floyd (4–7) || Motte (13) || 43,464 || 33–31
|- align="center" bgcolor="ffbbbb"
| 65 || June 15 || Royals 7:15pm || 3–2 || Mazzaro (3–1) || Lohse (6–2) || Broxton (16) || 42,001 || 33–32
|- align="center" bgcolor="bbffbb"
| 66 || June 16 || Royals 1:15pm || 10–7 || Boggs (1–1) || Collins (4–1) || Motte (14) || 42,018 || 34–32
|- align="center" bgcolor="ffbbbb"
| 67 || June 17 || Royals 1:15pm || 5–3 (15) || Broxton (1–1) || Sánchez (0–1) || || 41,680 || 34–33
|- align="center" bgcolor="ffbbbb"
| 68 || June 19 || @ Tigers 6:05pm * || 6–3 || Verlander (7–4) || Lynn (10–3) || Coke (1) || 36,733 || 34–34
|- align="center" bgcolor="bbffbb"
| 69 || June 20 || @ Tigers 6:05pm * || 3–1 || Westbrook (6–6) || Porcello (4–5) || || 38,871 || 35–34
|- align="center" bgcolor="ffbbbb"
| 70 || June 21 || @ Tigers 12:05pm || 2–1 (10) || Benoit (1–1) || Marte (0–1) || || 40,776 || 35–35
|- align="center" bgcolor="bbffbb"
| 71 || June 22 || @ Royals 7:10pm || 11–4 || Kelly (1–0) || Mazzaro (3–2) || || 37,902 || 36–35
|- align="center" bgcolor="bbffbb"
| 72 || June 23 || @ Royals 1:10pm || 8–2 || Wainwright (6–7) || Mendoza (2–4) || || 37,240 || 37–35
|- align="center" bgcolor="bbffbb"
| 73 || June 24 || @ Royals 1:10pm || 11–8 || Marte (1–1) || Collins (4–2) || || 29,063 || 38–35
|- align="center" bgcolor="bbffbb"
| 74 || June 25 || @ Marlins 6:10pm * || 8–7 (10) || Marte (2–1) || Gaudin (1–1) || Motte (15) || 27,369 || 39–35
|- align="center" bgcolor="bbffbb"
| 75 || June 26 || @ Marlins 6:10pm || 5–2 || Lohse (7–2) || Zambrano (4–6) || Motte (16) || 25,444 || 40–35
|- align="center" bgcolor="ffbbbb"
| 76 || June 27 || @ Marlins 6:10pm || 5–3 || Sánchez (4–6) || Freeman (0–1) || Bell (15) || 28,397 || 40–36
|- align="center" bgcolor="ffbbbb"
| 77 || June 29 || Pirates 7:15pm || 14–5 || Correia (4–6) || Wainwright (6–8) || || 45,382 || 40–37
|- align="center" bgcolor="ffbbbb"
| 78 || June 30 || Pirates 1:15pm || 7–3 || Karstens (1–2) || Lynn (10–4) || Hughes (1) || 37,162 || 40–38
|-

|- align="center" bgcolor="bbffbb"
| 79 || July 1 || Pirates 1:15pm || 5–4 || Westbrook (7–6) || Bédard (4–9) || Motte (17) || 37,821 || 41–38
|- align="center" bgcolor="bbffbb"
| 80 || July 2 || Rockies 7:15pm || 9–3 || Lohse (8–2) || Chatwood (1–1) || || 39,456 || 42–38
|- align="center" bgcolor="ffbbbb"
| 81 || July 3 || Rockies 7:15pm || 3–2 || Francis (2–1) || Kelly (1–1) || Betancourt (13) || 41,701 || 42–39
|- align="center" bgcolor="bbffbb"
| 82 || July 4 || Rockies 6:15pm || 4–1 || Wainwright (7–8) || Guthrie (3–8) || Motte (18) || 42,338 || 43–39
|- align="center" bgcolor="bbffbb"
| 83 || July 5 || Rockies 7:15pm || 6–2 || Lynn (11–4) || Friedrich (4–6) || Motte (19) || 41,751 || 44–39
|- align="center" bgcolor="ffbbbb"
| 84 || July 6 || Marlins 7:15pm || 3–2 ||Nolasco (8–6) || Westbrook (7–7) || Bell (19) || 46,721 || 44–40
|- align="center" bgcolor="bbffbb"
| 85 || July 7 || Marlins 1:15pm || 3–2 || Lohse (9–2) || Zambrano (4–7) || Motte (20) || 41,312 || 45–40
|- align="center" bgcolor="bbffbb"
| 86 || July 8 || Marlins 1:15pm || 5–4 || Boggs (2–1) || Bell (2–5) || || 38,436 || 46–40
|- align="center" bgcolor="bbbbbb"
| -- || July 10 || 83rd All-Star Game ||colspan=6|National League 8,   American League 0   (Kansas City, Missouri;  Kaufmann Stadium)
|- align="center" bgcolor="ffbbbb"
| 87 || July 13 || @ Reds 6:10pm || 5–3 || Simón (1–1) || Wainwright (7–9) || Chapman (12) || 40,217 || 46–41
|- align="center" bgcolor="ffbbbb"
| 88 || July 14 || @ Reds 3:05pm (Fox) || 3–2 (10) || LeCure (3–2) || Marte (2–2) || || 37,583 || 46–42
|- align="center" bgcolor="ffbbbb"
| 89 || July 15 || @ Reds 7:00pm (ESPN) || 4–2 || Bailey (8–6) || Westbrook (7–8) || Chapman (13) || 39,280 || 46–43
|- align="center" bgcolor="bbffbb"
| 90 || July 16 || @ Brewers 7:10pm || 3–2 || Motte (4–3) || Axford (2–6) || || 30,128 || 47–43
|- align="center" bgcolor="ffbbbb"
| 91 || July 17 || @ Brewers 7:10pm || 3–2 || Wolf (3–6) || Kelly (1–2) || Rodríguez (2) || 30,491 || 47–44
|- align="center" bgcolor="ffbbbb"
| 92 || July 18 || @ Brewers 1:10pm || 4–3 || Axford (3–6) || Wainwright (7–10) || Rodríguez (3) || 37,753 || 47–45
|- align="center" bgcolor="bbffbb"
| 93 || July 20 || Cubs 7:15pm || 4–1 || Lohse (10–2) || Dempster (5–4) || Motte (21) || 43,786 || 48–45
|- align="center" bgcolor="bbffbb"
| 94 || July 21 || Cubs 6:15pm || 12–0 || Westbrook (8–8) || Germano (0–1) || || 43,424 || 49–45
|- align="center" bgcolor="bbffbb"
| 95 || July 22 || Cubs 1:15pm || 7–0 || Lynn (12–4) || Wood (4–5) || || 42,411 || 50–45
|- align="center" bgcolor="ffbbbb"
| 96 || July 23 || Dodgers 7:15pm || 5–3 || Billingsley (5–9) || Kelly (1–3) || Jansen (19) || 42,806 || 50–46
|- align="center" bgcolor="bbffbb"
| 97 || July 24 || Dodgers 7:15pm * || 8–2 || Wainwright (8–10) || Kershaw (7–6) || || 38,195 || 51–46
|- align="center" bgcolor="bbffbb"
| 98 || July 25 || Dodgers 7:15pm * || 3–2 (12) || Salas (1–3) || Wright (4–3) || || 37,841 || 52–46
|- align="center" bgcolor="bbffbb"
| 99 || July 26 || Dodgers 12:45pm || 7–4 || Westbrook (9–8) || Capuano (10–6) || Motte (22) || 36,607 || 53–46
|- align="center" bgcolor="bbffbb"
| 100 || July 27 || @ Cubs 1:20pm || 9–6 || Lynn (13–4) || Wood (4–6) || Motte (23) || 40,778 || 54–46
|- align="center" bgcolor="ffbbbb"
| 101 || July 28 || @ Cubs 12:05pm || 3–2 || Russell (4–0) || Kelly (1–4) || Mármol (13) || 41,276 || 54–47
|- align="center" bgcolor="ffbbbb"
| 102 || July 29 || @ Cubs 1:20pm || 4–2 (10) || Russell (5–0) || Rosenthal (0–1) || || 39,534 || 54–48
|- align="center" bgcolor="bbffbb"
| 103 || July 31 || @ Rockies 7:40pm || 11–6 || Lohse (11–2) || Francis (3–3) || || 31,297 || 55–48
|-

|- align="center" bgcolor="bbffbb"
| 104 || August 1 || @ Rockies 7:40pm || 9–6 || Westbrook (10–8) || Belisle (3–3) || || 29,547 || 56–48
|- align="center" bgcolor="ffbbbb"
| 105 || August 2 || @ Rockies 7:40pm || 8–2 || Brothers (6–2) || Salas (1–4) || || 29,659 || 56–49
|- align="center" bgcolor="bbffbb"
| 106 || August 3 || Brewers 7:15pm * || 9–3 || Kelly (2–4) || Wolf (3–8) || || 41,505 || 57–49
|- align="center" bgcolor="bbffbb"
| 107 || August 4 || Brewers 6:15pm || 6–1 || Wainwright (9–10) || Rogers (0–1) || || 42,036 || 58–49
|- align="center" bgcolor="bbffbb"
| 108 || August 5 || Brewers 7:05pm (ESPN) || 3–0 || Lohse (12–2) || Estrada (0–5) || Motte (24) || 40,274 || 59–49
|- align="center" bgcolor="bbffbb"
| 109 || August 6 || Giants 7:15pm || 8–2 || Westbrook (11–8) || Cain (10–5) || || 38,652 || 60–49
|- align="center" bgcolor="ffbbbb"
| 110 || August 7 || Giants 7:15pm || 4–2 || Zito (9–8) || Lynn (13–5) || Affeldt (3) || 41,293 || 60–50
|- align="center" bgcolor="ffbbbb"
| 111 || August 8 || Giants 7:15pm || 15–0 || Vogelsong (10–5) || Kelly (2–5) || || 36,906 || 60–51
|- align="center" bgcolor="bbffbb"
| 112 || August 9 || Giants 12:45pm || 3–1 || Wainwright (10–10) || Bumgarner (12–7) || Motte (25) || 32,810 || 61–51
|- align="center" bgcolor="ffbbbb"
| 113 || August 10 || @ Phillies 6:05pm * || 3–1 || Halladay (6–6) || Browning (0–1) || Papelbon (25) || 43,122 || 61–52
|- align="center" bgcolor="bbffbb"
| 114 || August 11 || @ Phillies 6:05pm || 4–1 || Westbrook (12–8) || Lee (2–7) || Motte (26) || 44,233 || 62–52
|- align="center" bgcolor="ffbbbb"
| 115 || August 12 || @ Phillies 12:35pm || 8–7 (11) || Horst (1–0) || Browning (0–2) || || 42,877 || 62–53
|- align="center" bgcolor="bbffbb"
| 116 || August 14 || Diamondbacks 7:15pm || 8–2 || Kelly (3–5) || Kennedy (10–10) || || 34,587 || 63–53
|- align="center" bgcolor="bbffbb"
| 117 || August 15 || Diamondbacks 7:15pm || 5–2 || Wainwright (11–10) || Saunders (6–9) || Motte (27) || 33,572 || 64–53
|- align="center" bgcolor="ffbbbb"
| 118 || August 16 || Diamondbacks 7:15pm || 2–1 || Hernandez (2–2) || Motte (4–4) || Putz (23) || 36,758 || 64–54
|- align="center" bgcolor="ffbbbb"
| 119 || August 17 || Pirates 7:15pm || 2–1 || McDonald (11–5) || Westbrook (12–9) || Hanrahan (34) || 38,689 || 64–55
|- align="center" bgcolor="bbffbb"
| 120 || August 18 || Pirates 3:05pm (Fox) || 5–4 || Browning (1–2) || Bédard (7–13) || Motte (28) || 40,313 || 65–55
|- align="center" bgcolor="ffbbbb"
| 121 || August 19 || Pirates 1:15pm || 6–3 (19) || Rodríguez (8–12) || Browning (1–3) || || 43,412 || 65–56
|- align="center" bgcolor="bbffbb"
| 122 || August 21 || Astros 7:15pm || 7–0 || Wainwright (12–10) || Harrell (10–9) || || 35,370 || 66–56
|- align="center" bgcolor="bbffbb"
| 123 || August 22 || Astros 7:15pm || 4–2 || Lohse (13–2) || Norris (5–11) || Motte (29) || 35,198 || 67–56
|- align="center" bgcolor="bbffbb"
| 124 || August 23 || Astros 12:45pm || 13–5 || Westbrook (13–9) || Keuchel (1–6) || || 30,343 || 68–56
|- align="center" bgcolor="bbffbb"
| 125 || August 24 || @ Reds 6:10pm || 8–5 || Kelly (4–5) || Latos (10–4) || Motte (30) || 36,162 || 69–56
|- align="center" bgcolor="ffbbbb"
| 126 || August 25 || @ Reds 3:05pm (Fox) || 8–2 || Leake (6–8) || García (3–5) || || 41,680 || 69–57
|- align="center" bgcolor="bbffbb"
| 127 || August 26 || @ Reds 12:10pm || 8–2 || Wainwright (13–10) || Bailey (10–9) || || 31,564 || 70–57
|- align="center" bgcolor="bbffbb"
| 128 || August 27 || @ Pirates 6:05pm || 4–3 || Lohse (14–2) || Burnett (15–5) || Motte (31) || 16,700 || 71–57
|- align="center" bgcolor="ffbbbb"
| 129 || August 28 || @ Pirates 6:05pm || 9–0 || McDonald (12–6) || Westbrook (13–10) || || 17,492 || 71–58
|- align="center" bgcolor="ffbbbb"
| 130 || August 29 || @ Pirates 6:05pm (ESPN) || 5–0 || Rodríguez (9–13) || Kelly (4–6) || || 19,398 || 71–59
|- align="center" bgcolor="ffbbbb"
| 131 || August 30 || @ Nationals 6:05pm || 8–1 || Jackson (8–9) || García (3–6) || || 23,269 || 71–60
|- align="center" bgcolor="ffbbbb"
| 132 || August 31 || @ Nationals 6:05pm || 10–0 || Gonzalez (17–7) || Wainwright (13–11) || || 29,499 || 71–61
|-

|- align="center" bgcolor="bbffbb"
| 133 || September 1 || @ Nationals 3:05pm (Fox) || 10–9 || Boggs (3–1) || Storen (1–1) || Motte (32) || 34,004 || 72–61
|- align="center" bgcolor="ffbbbb"
| 134 || September 2 || @ Nationals 12:35pm || 4–3 || Mattheus (5–1) || Lynn (13–6)  || Clippard (29) || 31,096 || 72–62
|- align="center" bgcolor="bbffbb"
| 135 || September 3 || Mets 1:15pm || 5–4 || Kelly (5–6) || McHugh (0–1) || Motte (33) || 40,952 || 73–62
|- align="center" bgcolor="bbffbb"
| 136 || September 4 || Mets 7:15pm || 5–1 || García (4–6) || Harvey (3–4) || || 34,108 || 74–62
|- align="center" bgcolor="ffbbbb"
| 137 || September 5 || Mets 12:45pm || 6–2 || Dickey (18–4) || Wainwright (13–12) || || 30,090 || 74–63
|- align="center" bgcolor="ffbbbb"
| 138 || September 7 || Brewers 7:15pm || 5–4 (13) || Kintzler (1–0) || Lynn (13–7) || Axford (26) || 38,648 || 74–64
|- align="center" bgcolor="ffbbbb"
| 139 || September 8 || Brewers 6:15pm || 6–3 || Fiers (9–7) || Westbrook (13–11) || Axford (27) || 40,422 || 74–65
|- align="center" bgcolor="bbffbb"
| 140 || September 9 || Brewers 1:15pm || 5–4 (10) || Lynn (14–7) || Loe (6–5) || || 39,919 || 75–65
|- align="center" bgcolor="ffbbbb"
| 141 || September 10 || @ Padres 9:05pm || 11–3 || Stults (6–2) || García (4–7) || || 18,081 || 75–66
|- align="center" bgcolor="ffbbbb"
| 142 || September 11 || @ Padres 9:05pm || 6–4 || Vólquez (10–10) || Wainwright (13–13) || Gregerson (6) || 29,887 || 75–67
|- align="center" bgcolor="ffbbbb"
| 143 || September 12 || @ Padres 5:35pm || 3–2 || Richard (13–12) || Lohse (14–3) || Gregerson (7) || 16,442 || 75–68
|- align="center" bgcolor="bbffbb"
| 144 || September 13 || @ Dodgers 9:10pm || 2–1 || Lynn (15–7) || Rodriguez (0–1) || Motte (34) || 43,309 || 76–68
|- align="center" bgcolor="ffbbbb"
| 145 || September 14 || @ Dodgers 9:10pm || 8–5 || Tolleson (2–1) || Rosenthal (0–2) || || 40,167 || 76–69
|- align="center" bgcolor="ffbbbb"
| 146 || September 15 || @ Dodgers 8:10pm || 4–3 || Belisario (6–1) || Motte (4–5) || || 42,449 || 76–70
|- align="center" bgcolor="bbffbb"
| 147 || September 16 || @ Dodgers 3:10pm || 5–2 (12) || Miller (1–0) || Ely (0–2) || Motte (35) || 35,754 || 77–70
|- align="center" bgcolor="bbffbb"
| 148 || September 18 || Astros 7:15pm || 4–1 || Lohse (15–3) || Abad (0–5) || Motte (36) || 35,422 || 78–70
|- align="center" bgcolor="bbffbb"
| 149 || September 19 || Astros 7:15pm || 5–0 || Lynn (16–7) || Harrell (10–10) || Motte (37) || 39,062 || 79–70
|- align="center" bgcolor="bbffbb"
| 150 || September 20 || Astros 12:45pm || 5–4 || García (5–7) || Norris (5–13) || Motte (38) || 34,788 || 80–70
|- align="center" bgcolor="ffbbbb"
| 151 || September 21 || @ Cubs 1:20pm || 5–4 (11) || Cabrera (1–1) || Kelly (5–7) || || 29,100 || 80–71
|- align="center" bgcolor="bbffbb"
| 152 || September 22 || @ Cubs 12:05pm || 5–4 (10) || Boggs (4–1) || Chapman (0–1) || Motte (39) || 40,298 || 81–71
|- align="center" bgcolor="bbffbb"
| 153 || September 23 || @ Cubs 1:20pm || 6–3 || Lohse (16–3) || Germano (2–9) || Motte (40) || 33,354 || 82–71
|- align="center" bgcolor="bbffbb"
| 154 || September 24 || @ Astros 7:05pm || 6–1 || Lynn (17–7) || Abad (0–6) || || 12,584 || 83–71
|- align="center" bgcolor="bbffbb"
| 155 || September 25 || @ Astros 7:05pm || 4–0 || García (6–7) || Harrell (10–11) || || 16,943 || 84–71
|- align="center" bgcolor="ffbbbb"
| 156 || September 26 || @ Astros 7:05pm || 2–0 || Norris (6–13) || Carpenter (0–1) || López (8) || 18,712 || 84–72
|- align="center" bgcolor="bbffbb"
| 157 || September 28 || Nationals 7:15pm || 12–2 || Wainwright (14–13) || Jackson (9–11) || || 39,166 || 85–72
|- align="center" bgcolor="ffbbbb"
| 158 || September 29 || Nationals 6:15pm || 6–4 (10) || Storen (3–1) || Freeman (0–2) || Stammen (1) || 42,264 || 85–73
|- align="center" bgcolor="bbffbb"
| 159 || September 30 || Nationals 1:15pm || 10–4 || Lynn (18–7) || Detwiler (10–8) || || 40,084 || 86–73
|-

|- align="center" bgcolor="bbffbb"
| 160 || October 1 || Reds 7:15pm || 4–2 || García (7–7) || Arroyo (12–10) || Motte (41) || 38,480 || 87–73
|- align="center" bgcolor="ffbbbb"
| 161 || October 2 || Reds 7:15pm || 3–1 || Latos (14–4) || Carpenter (0–2) || Chapman (38) || 39,644 || 87–74
|- align="center" bgcolor="bbffbb"
| 162 || October 3 || Reds 7:15pm || 1–0 || Marte (3–2) || Broxton (4–5) || Motte (42) || 42,509 || 88–74
|-

See also
Regular Season Schedule (calendar style) 
Regular Season Schedule (sortable text) 
National Broadcast Schedule (all teams), EDT

Postseason Game Log

|- align="center" bgcolor="ffbbbb"
| 1 || October 7 || Nationals || 2–3 || || || || || 0–1
|- align="center" bgcolor="bbffbb"
| 2 || October 8 || Nationals || 12–4 || || || || || 1–1
|- align="center" bgcolor="bbffbb"
| 3 || October 10 || @ Nationals || 8–0 || || || || || 2–1
|- align="center" bgcolor="ffbbbb"
| 4 || October 11 || @ Nationals || 1–2 || || || || || 2–2
|- align="center" bgcolor="bbffbb"
| 5 || October 12 || @ Nationals || 9–7 || || || || || 3–2
|-

|- align="center" bgcolor="bbffbb"
| 1 || October 14 || @ Giants || 6–4 || || || || || 1–0
|- align="center" bgcolor="ffbbbb"
| 2 || October 15 || @ Giants || 1–7 || || || || || 1–1
|- align="center" bgcolor="bbffbb"
| 3 || October 17 || Giants || 3–1 || || || || || 2–1
|- align="center" bgcolor="bbffbb"
| 4 || October 18 || Giants || 8–3 || || || || || 3–1
|- align="center" bgcolor="ffbbbb"
| 5 || October 19 || Giants || 0–5 || || || || || 3–2
|- align="center" bgcolor="ffbbbb"
| 6 || October 21 || @ Giants || 1–6 || || || || || 3–3
|- align="center" bgcolor="ffbbbb"
| 7 || October 22 || @ Giants || 0–9 || || || || || 3–4
|-

Cardinals Record When
(through October 3, final)

Postseason

Wild Card Game
Friday, October 5, 2012

Time: 3:09 (19 min. delay) 
Attendance: 52,631 
Official Box Score

Division Series

Game 1, October 7
3:07 p.m. (EDT) at Busch Stadium in St. Louis, Missouri

Game 2, October 8
4:37 p.m. (EDT) at Busch Stadium in St. Louis, Missouri

Game 3, October 10
1:07 p.m. (EDT) at Nationals Park in Washington, D.C.

Game 4, October 11
4:07 p.m. (EDT) at Nationals Park in Washington, D.C.

Game 5, October 12
8:37 p.m. (EDT) at Nationals Park in Washington, D.C.

Time: 3:49 
Attendance: 45,966 
Official Box Score

Composite line score
2012 NLDS (3–2): St. Louis Cardinals over Washington Nationals

National League Championship Series

Game 1
Sunday, October 14, 2012 – 8:15 p.m. (EDT) at AT&T Park in San Francisco, California

In Game 1, Carlos Beltrán hit his 14th career postseason homer and David Freese also went deep as the Cardinals took a 6–4 lead over the San Francisco Giants after six innings of the NL championship series opener. Freese hit a two-run homer in the second and Beltrán followed with one in the fourth as the Cardinals knocked out Madison Bumgarner with six runs in  innings.

Bumgarner breezed through a perfect first inning but ran into trouble in the second when Yadier Molina singled on an 0–2 pitch with one out. Freese then drove a 3–2 pitch over the wall in left-center to give the Cardinals a 2–0 lead. That gave Freese 25 career RBIs in the postseason and tied him with Molina for third most ever for the Cardinals. Bumgarner then couldn't make it out of the fourth. Descalso doubled and scored on Pete Kozma's double. Jon Jay added a two-out RBI single and Beltrán ended Bumgarner's night with the homer.

George Kontos got out of the fourth and Tim Lincecum pitched two hitless innings as he once again excelled in his new role out of the bullpen.

Lance Lynn struggled to hold onto that lead in his first postseason start after 10 career relief appearances. After starting the game with three hitless innings, Lynn ran into trouble with two outs and a runner on first in the fourth. Hunter Pence and Brandon Belt followed with singles to drive in San Francisco's first run. They both scored on Gregor Blanco's triple. Brandon Crawford followed with an RBI double to make it 6–4 and Lynn left after walking pinch-hitter Aubrey Huff. Joe Kelly got out of the jam when second baseman Daniel Descalso made a diving stop of Ángel Pagán's grounder up the middle.

No runs were scored for the remainder of the contest.

Game 2
Monday, October 15, 2012 – 8:07 p.m. (EDT) at AT&T Park in San Francisco, California

Game 3
Wednesday, October 17, 2012 – 4:07 p.m. (EDT) at Busch Stadium in St. Louis, Missouri

A 3-hour 28 min rain delay was longer than the time of the game itself at 3:02.

Game 4
Thursday, October 18, 2012 – 8:07 p.m. (EDT) at Busch Stadium in St. Louis, Missouri

The second-largest crowd of the year 47,062 saw the Cardinals win, 8-3. Adam Wainwright went seven strong innings, giving up only four hits and one run, the home run to Hunter Pence, walking none and striking out five.

Game 5
Friday, October 19, 2012 – 8:07 p.m. (EDT) at Busch Stadium in St. Louis, Missouri

Game 6
Sunday, October 21, 2012 – 7:45 p.m. (EDT) at AT&T Park in San Francisco, California

Game 7
Monday, October 22, 2012 – 8:07 p.m. (EDT) at AT&T Park in San Francisco, California

Composite line score
2012 NLCS (4–3): San Francisco Giants over St. Louis Cardinals

Farm system

LEAGUE CHAMPIONS: Springfield

Draft selections
St. Louis Cardinals 2012 Draft Selections

References

External links

2012 St. Louis Cardinals season Schedule
St. Louis Cardinals 2012 season at Baseball Reference
St. Louis Cardinals TEAM AUDIT at Baseball Prospectus

St. Louis Cardinals seasons
St. Louis Cardinals
2012 in sports in Missouri